Bitter Pill is the debut studio album of the Irish singer-songwriter Gavin James. It was released in Ireland on 20 November 2015 and its international release was on 11 March 2016. It was released on Good Soldier Songs and Believe, LLP under exclusive license to Capitol Records, Sony Music and Warner Bros. Records.

The album peaked at number 5 on the Irish Albums Chart and made it to number 52 on the UK Albums Chart. It also charted in the Netherlands, France, Belgium and Switzerland.

Track listing

Deluxe edition
A limited deluxe edition was released in two CDs, CD 1 being the original album and CD containing live renditions of the tracks. In addition, the set included signed album card.

CD 1
Same as above

CD 2

Singles
Five tracks from the album have been released as singles:

2014: "The Book of Love
2015: "For You"
2015: "Bitter Pill"
2015: "22"
2016: "Nervous"

Charts

References

2016 albums
Gavin James (singer) albums
Albums produced by Cam Blackwood